Daniel Goneau (born January 16, 1976) is a Canadian former professional ice hockey player, who played in the National Hockey League with the New York Rangers.

Biography
As a youth, Goneau played in the 1990 Quebec International Pee-Wee Hockey Tournament with a minor ice hockey team from Verdun, Quebec.

Goneau was originally drafted by the Boston Bruins at the 1994 NHL Entry Draft, but chose not to sign with them. Two years later, he was drafted by the Rangers in the 1996 NHL Entry Draft. Goneau played in 41 games during the 1996–97 NHL season, collecting ten goals and three assists for 13 points. The following season he played in only 11 games scoring twice, while spending most of the season with the Rangers' American Hockey League (AHL) affiliate, the Hartford Wolf Pack. After spending the entire 1998–99 season with the Wolf Pack, Goneau returned for one more game during the 1999–2000 season which proved to be his final game in the NHL. 

Goneau later played in the AHL, the International Hockey League and the United Hockey League, before retiring in 2008. He also played in the United Kingdom for the Bracknell Bees during the 2001–02 ISL season, scoring 15 points in as many games.

Career statistics

References

External links
 

1976 births
Living people
Binghamton Rangers players
Boston Bruins draft picks
Canadian ice hockey left wingers
Detroit Vipers players
Fife Flyers players
Hartford Wolf Pack players
Hershey Bears players
Ice hockey people from Montreal
Lowell Lock Monsters players
Manitoba Moose (IHL) players
New York Rangers draft picks
New York Rangers players
Canadian expatriate ice hockey players in England
Canadian expatriate ice hockey players in Scotland
Canadian expatriate ice hockey players in the United States